Radio Maximum is a Russian radio station, specializing in pop and rock music.

Maximum was founded in 1991 as a joint venture of Westwood One, Harris Corporation, StoryFirst Communications, and The Moscow News weekly. It started broadcasting in Moscow on December 25, 1991 on the frequency of 103.7 MHz. Broadcasting in St. Petersburg commenced in early 1993. The radiostation was among the first Russian music stations to start round the clock broadcasting in 1994.

Maximum's format is broad, and includes both western and Russian rock and pop music.

The station is popular, with a successful morning show, which at different times was hosted by such celebrities as Olga Maximova, Kostya Mikhalov, Gennady Bachinsky and Sergey Stillavin.

Radio Maximum is also known for the Maxidrom rock festival, which used to be held every May in Moscow, Russia.

External links
 

Radio stations established in 1991
Radio stations in Russia
Russian-language radio stations
Mass media in Moscow